Cornularia may refer to:

 Cornularia (coral), a genus of soft corals in the family Cornulariidae
 Cornularia (fungus), a genus of fungi in the family Dermateaceae